David Gordon Brooks (born 12 January 1953 in Canberra) is an Australian poet, novelist, short-fiction writer and essayist. He is the author of four published novels, four collections of short stories and five collections of poetry, and his work has won or been shortlisted for major prizes. Brooks is a highly intellectual writer, and his fiction has drawn frequent comparison with the writers Italo Calvino and Jorge Luis Borges. 

He studied poetics at the Australian National University (ANU) and in Toronto, Canada, from 1971 to 1986. He has been a hand-press printer of high-quality works, and was an editor of the Australian poetry journals New Poetry, Helix and Southerly. He taught literature at several Australian universities, followed by the Creative Writing program at Sydney University from 1999 to 2013.

He is a long-term vegan, and writes extensively for and about animals and animal suffering.

Early life

Brooks was born in 1953 to H. Gordon Brooks and Norma Brooks (née Jeffrey) in Canberra. In late 1954 his father, a public servant in the Department of Foreign Affairs, was posted to Athens as an immigration attaché, and Brooks'  early childhood was spent in Greece and Yugoslavia, where his father served in 1958. Upon the family's return to Australia Brooks attended Turner Infants, Turner Primary and Canberra High schools. His last year of high school was spent in Cleveland, Ohio, on an American Field Service scholarship. Before leaving, he experienced an illness which kept him bed-bound for two months, a period he spent in intense reading of Sartre, de Beauvoir, Camus, James Joyce and others who were formative to his writing life. 

From 1971-75 Brooks attended the Australian National University, where his teachers included R.F. Brissenden and A.D. Hope. Hope and Brissenden would subsequently become friends, whose poetry Brooks would later edit. Amongst his fellow students were Alan Gould, Kevin Hart, Philip Mead and other poets of what is sometimes referred to as 'the Canberra school'. With Gould, Brooks founded the Open Door Press, the publications of which were all hand-set and printed by hand-press.

Brooks married Alison Summers in 1975 and together they moved to Canada to pursue postgraduate work at the University of Toronto. While in Canada, writing his PhD on the poetics of Pound's early cantos, he served as overseas editor for New Poetry and as a scout for the Literature Board of the Australia Council, helping to arrange Australian residencies for Michael Ondaatje, Galway Kinnell, Mark Strand and others. He was also the hand-press printer and demonstrator for Massey College at the University of Toronto. In 1978, in Toronto, he experienced a period of paralysis from the waist down, which he believed for many years to have been a manifestation of Guillain-Barré syndrome.

Back in Australia, Brooks taught initially at Duntroon as a one-year replacement for the critic Dorothy Green, then at the University of Western Australia. He and Summers divorced in 1984. Brooks subsequently formed a long relationship with the poet Nicolette Stasko. His only child, their daughter Jessica, was born in 1985. While in Western Australia Brooks published his first collections of poetry and short fiction. His first collection of poetry, The Cold Front (1983), won the Ann Elder Award and was shortlisted for the NSW Premier's Prize. The Book of Sei in 1985 was his first collection of stories.

Career

Brooks returned to Canberra in 1986 to teach at the A.N.U. – a period marked by the publication of the pioneering Poetry and Gender, which he edited with Brenda Walker – and in 1991 took up a lectureship in Australian Literature at the University of Sydney. He briefly edited the journal Helix and oversaw its transition to The Phoenix Review. In 1995 he published his first novel, The House of Balthus (based on the paintings of Balthasar Klossowski de Rola), a novel subsequently translated into German and Polish. In 1999 he was asked to succeed Elizabeth Webby as editor of the journal Southerly and accepted on the understanding that the editorship be shared (from 2000 until 2007 with Noel Rowe; from 2007 until the present with Elizabeth McMahon). In the same year (1999) he became Director of the University of Sydney's Graduate Writing Program. 

In 2005, Brooks and Stasko having separated, he married the Slovenian-born scholar/activist Teya Pribac, whom he had first encountered when visiting Slovenia to launch an anthology of Australian poetry edited by his long-time friend Bert Pribac (no relation of Teya Pribac). Subsequently, Brooks has developed a strong connection with Slovenia, translating (among others) Slovenia's premier modern poet Srecko Kosovel with Bert Pribac, and seen his own work published in Slovenian editions. 

his second novel, The Fern Tattoo (2007), was shortlisted for the Miles Franklin award and other awards 

In 2010 Brooks was diagnosed with secondary progressive Multiple Sclerosis. In the following year he published The Sons of Clovis, a major work of Australian literary history, on the Ern Malley hoax, and the Symboliste tradition in Australian poetry. He resigned his university post early in 2013. 

Since then, a long-term vegan, Brooks has devoted his time increasingly to animal advocacy. He and Pribac live in the Blue Mountains, with rescued sheep. In 2016 he published Derrida’s Breakfast, a suite of essays on poetry, philosophy and animals, and early in 2018 he completed the 100 Days Kangaroo Project, one hundred posts in one hundred days, offering a cross-section of the kangaroo in contemporary Australian society.

He has completed a fifth novel, provisionally entitled Metamorphosis, and Animal Dreams, a substantial collection of essays on animals, literature and philosophy. In 2018 David Brooks retired from the editorship of Southerly. Volume 78 - Number 1 - 2018 "Festschrift" pays tribute to his writing.

Style

In his poetry Brooks was initially significantly influenced by the T’ang Dynasty poets of Ancient China, the 'deep image' poets of the United States (Galway Kinnell, James Wright, Robert Bly), and the Polish poet Czesław Miłosz, whom he met in Toronto in the late 1970s. His early fiction was influenced by the magic realism of Gabriel Garcia Marquez and others, and the speculative fiction of Jorge Luis Borges and Italo Calvino. His fiction has at times been marked by a distinctive mixing of genres both within writing itself and (mixing, for example, fiction and philosophy) within the thought behind it. While generally regarded as a poet of the 'natural' world, he is often seen as a philosophical novelist, concerned in particular with the borders of and between ways of thinking and being.

Bibliography

Novels
 The House of Balthus. St Leonards, NSW: Allen & Unwin, 1995.
 The Fern Tattoo. St Lucia, QLD: University of Queensland Press, 2007.
 The Umbrella Club. St Lucia: University of Queensland Press, 2009.
 The Conversation. St Lucia: University of Queensland Press, 2012.

Poetry
 The Cold Front. Sydney: Hale & Iremonger, 1983.
 Walking to Point Clear. Blackheath: Brandl & Schlesinger, 2005.
 Urban Elegies. Sydney: Island Press, 2007.
 The Balcony. St Lucia: University of Queensland Press, 2008.
 Open House. St Lucia: University of Queensland Press, 2015.

Short fiction
 The Book of Sei and Other Stories. Sydney: Hale & Iremonger, 1985. The Book of Sei. London: Faber & Faber, 1987.
 Sheep and the Diva. Melbourne: McPhee Gribble, 1990.
 Black Sea. Sydney: Allen & Unwin, 1997.
 Napoleon's Roads. St Lucia: University of Queensland Press, 2016.

Non-fiction
 The Necessary Jungle: Literature and Excess. Melbourne: McPhee Gribble, 1990.
 De/scription. Sydney: Vagabond Press, 2000.
 The Sons of Clovis: Ern Malley, Adoré Floupette and a Secret History of Australian Poetry, St Lucia: University of Queensland Press, 2011.
 Derrida's Breakfast (four essays). Blackheath: Brandl & Schlesinger, 2016.
 The Grass Library. Blackheath: Brandl & Schlesinger, 2019.

Edited
 With Brenda Walker Poetry and Gender. St Lucia: University of Queensland Press, 1989.
 A. D. Hope: Selected Poems. Sydney: HarperCollins/Angus & Robertson, 1991.
 Suddenly Evening: Selected Poems of R.F. Brissenden. Melbourne: McPhee Gribble, 1991.
 The Double Looking Glass: New and Classic Essays on the Poetry of A. D. Hope. St Lucia: University of Queensland Press, 2000.
 Selected Poetry and Prose of A. D. Hope. Sydney: Halstead Press, 2000.

Awards

Personal Award

2015/16 Australia Council Fellowship in Fiction

Awards for individual works

Poem sequence (1978)
-	Winner 1978 University of Toronto E.J. Pratt Medal and Prize for Poetry

The Cold Front (1983)
-	Winner 1983 FAW Anne Elder Poetry Award
-	Shortlisted 1983 NSW Premier's Prize for poetry

The House of Balthus (1995)
-	Shortlisted 2010 Australian Book Review Fan Poll
-	Shortlisted 1995 Aurealis Award for Excellence in Australian Speculative Fiction
-	Shortlisted 1996 NBC Banjo Award for Fiction

'Back After eight Months Away', poem sequence (1996)
-	Winner (joint) 1996 Newcastle Poetry Prize

Walking to Point Clear (2005)
-	Shortlisted 2006 Adelaide Festival John Bray Award for poetry

'The Magician', poem sequence (2006)
-	Shortlisted The Broadway Poetry Prize

The Fern Tattoo (2007)
-	Shortlisted 2010 Australian Book Review Fan Poll
-	Shortlisted 2008 Miles Franklin Award
-	Shortlisted 2007 Colin Roderick Award (for 'the best book published in Australia which deals with any aspect of Australian life')

The Balcony (2008)
-	Shortlisted 2009 NSW Premier's Kenneth Slessor Award for poetry

The Sons of Clovis (2011)
-	Shortlisted 2011 Colin Roderick Award

The Conversation (2012)
-	Shortlisted 2013 Western Australian Premier's Award for fiction

Open House (2015)
-	Shortlisted 2015 Queensland Literary Awards, Judith Wright Calanthe Award for poetry

Derrida’s Breakfast (2016)
-	Runner up 2016 Mascara Award for Non-fiction

Sources

External links

1953 births
Living people
Australian National University alumni
Academic staff of the Australian National University
Australian literary critics
Australian magazine editors
Australian male short story writers
Australian poets
Meanjin people
Academic staff of the University of Sydney
University of Toronto alumni